Annie Isabel Fraer  (née McLean, 21 September 1868 – 8 March 1939) was a New Zealand community leader. She was born in Andersons Bay, Dunedin, New Zealand, on 21 September 1868.

From 1929 to 1933 she was a member of the Christchurch City Council.

In 1935, she was awarded the King George V Silver Jubilee Medal. Later that year, she was appointed a Member of the Order of the British Empire, for public services, in the 1935 King's Birthday and Silver Jubilee Honours.

References

1868 births
1939 deaths
People from Dunedin
Christchurch City Councillors
New Zealand Members of the Order of the British Empire